Johanna Margarethe Costenoble, née Johanna Margarethe Steinhäuser (10 September 1777, in Bayreuth – 16 July 1828, in Vienna) was a German stage actress.

Life 
Costenoble devoted herself entirely to the stage. From 1801 to 1818 she was engaged in Hamburg and from 1818 until her death at the Hofburgtheater. She was married with the actor Karl Ludwig Costenoble.

Bibliography 
 Ludwig Eisenberg: Großes biographisches Lexikon der Deutschen Bühne im XIX. Jahrhundert. Edited by Paul List, Leipzig 1903,

References 

1777 births
1828 deaths
People from Bayreuth
19th-century German actresses
German stage actresses